The Coast Fork Willamette River is one of two forks that unite to form the Willamette River in western Oregon in the United States.

Course
The Coast Fork Willamette River is formed in southwestern Lane County, in the Calapooya Mountains, by the confluence of the Little River and the Big River. The Coast Fork flows north through the mountains, through the Cottage Grove Lake reservoir, to Cottage Grove, where it receives the Row River from the southeast.

See also
 List of rivers of Oregon
Willamette Riverkeeper

References

External links
 

Rivers of Lane County, Oregon
Rivers of Oregon
Tributaries of the Willamette River